Tingena phegophylla is a species of moth in the family Oecophoridae. It is endemic to New Zealand and has been observed in the southern parts of the South Island. This species inhabits native beech forest. The adults of this species are on the wing in December.

Taxonomy
This species was first described by Edward Meyrick in 1883 using specimens collected at Lake Wakatipu in December and named  Oecophora phegophylla. Meyrick went on to give a more detailed description in 1884. In 1915 Meyrick placed this species within the Borkhausenia genus. In 1926 Alfred Philpott was unable to study the genitalia of the male of this species as no specimens were held in New Zealand collections however Dugdale points out that the genitalia of basella agrees with the genitalia of the lectotype of T. phegophylla. George Hudson discussed and illustrated this species under the name B. phegophylla in his 1928 publication The butterflies and moths of New Zealand. In 1988 Dugdale placed this species in the genus Tingena. The male lectotype is held at the Natural History Museum, London.

Description 

Meyrick first described this species as follows:

Meyrick's more detailed description is as follows:
The colouring of this species closely resembles a dead native beech leaf.

Distribution 
This species is endemic to New Zealand. It has been observed in the southern parts of the South Island including its type locality of Lake Wakatipu, at Leithen Bush, and in the Routeburn Valley.

Behaviour 
The adults of the species are on the wing in December.

Habitat 
This species has been observed inhabiting native beech forest and have been collected off Nothofagus solandri.

References 

Oecophoridae
Moths of New Zealand
Moths described in 1883
Endemic fauna of New Zealand
Taxa named by Edward Meyrick
Endemic moths of New Zealand